Chalmers Hadley (September 3, 1872 – May 11, 1958) was an American librarian and educator. Hadley served as librarian of Denver Public Library from 1911 to 1924 and the Public Library of Cincinnati and Hamilton County from 1924 to 1945.

He was president of the American Library Association from 1919 to 1920.

Bibliography
 The Library War Service and some things it has taught Bulletin of the American Library Association, Volume 13 (July 1, 1919)
 What Library Schools can do for the profession Bulletin of the American Library Association, volume 6 (July 1, 1912)
 Material for a Public Library Campaign (American Library Association, 1907)

References

 
 

1872 births
1958 deaths
American librarians
Presidents of the American Library Association